DDU: District Detective Unit is an Irish crime drama series, first aired on RTÉ One in 1998, under the title of Making the Cut. The series focuses on a serial crime unit based in Waterford, Ireland, headed by Sergeant Carl McCadden (Sean McGinley), who tackle the murky underworld of crime in Dublin. The series explores the heartbreaking and tragic impact of crime on Irish society and explores the personal impact on the detectives at the centre of the story, whose lives are permanently changing as they are exposed to the harsh underbelly of the Celtic Tiger.

Making the Cut, a single 120-minute pilot, aired in 1998, based on the novel of the same name by writer Jim Lusby. Following strong viewing figures and critical acclaim, a four part follow-up, entitled DDU: District Detective Unit, was commissioned for broadcast in 1999. DDU comprises two two-part stories, "Unforgiven" and "The Gates of Eden". "Unforgiven" explores the desperate realities of prostitution and the devastating effect of child abuse focusing on the effects of retribution by the victim. "The Gates of Eden" deals with the ever-increasing problem of immigration and what happens when a Romanian family forced to leave their homeland, become embroiled in somebody else’s criminal plans.

Despite being heralded as one of the finest original crime dramas to originate from Ireland, DDU was not recommissioned. Notably, the series has never been released on DVD.

Cast
 Sean McGinley as Garda Det. Carl McCadden 
 Andrea Irvine	as Garda Det. Moya O'Donnell
 Dermot Martin	as Garda Det. Brendan Cronin 
 Owen Roe as Garda Det. Paul Hyland 
 Conor McDermottroe as Garda Det. Frank Duffy 
 Gerard McSorley as Garda Det. Mick Casey
 Jim Norton as Garda Det. Tom Regan
 Ingrid Craigie as Dr. Kate Dempsey 
 Bosco Hogan as Garda Chief Inspector Cody 
 Mary O'Driscoll as Brenda Boyle

Episodes

Pilot (1998)

Series (1999)

References

1998 Irish television series debuts
1999 Irish television series endings
RTÉ original programming
Irish drama television series
Police procedural television series